The Prescott Rural High School, on West 4th Street in Prescott, Kansas, was built in 1924.  It has also been known as Prescott Elementary School.  It was listed on the National Register of Historic Places in 2008 as part of a Multiple Property Submission for public schools in Kansas.

It was designed by architect Ray L. Gamble and is of Early Commercial architecture, with Mission/Spanish Revival architecture details. It was expanded by rear additions in about 1950 and
1961.

References

School buildings on the National Register of Historic Places in Kansas
Buildings designated early commercial in the National Register of Historic Places
School buildings completed in 1924
National Register of Historic Places in Linn County, Kansas
1924 establishments in Kansas